Grace Dieu can refer to:
Grace Dieu (ship), an English fifteenth century ship
Grace Dieu Abbey, Augustinian abbey, County Dublin
Grace Dieu Abbey, Monmouth in Monmouthshire, Wales
Grace-Dieu, Leicestershire place 
Grace Dieu Priory, Augustinian abbey at Grace Dieu, Leicestershire
Grace Dieu Manor School, a former preparatory school in Leicestershire
Grace Dieu Manor, nineteenth century Grade II* country house
Grâce à Dieu, also known as By the Grace of God, a 2019 French film by François Ozon

See also
Henry Grace à Dieu, a Tudor-era warship